Ro07-9749 is a benzodiazepine derivative with sedative and anxiolytic effects, which has been used as an internal standard in the analysis of other benzodiazepines, and also sold as a designer drug.

See also 
 Flubromazepam
 Norflurazepam
 Phenazepam
 Ro05-4435

References 

Designer drugs
GABAA receptor positive allosteric modulators
Fluoroarenes
Benzodiazepines
Iodoarenes